A tea strainer is a type of strainer that is placed over or in a teacup to catch loose tea leaves. 

When tea is brewed in the traditional manner in a teapot, the tea leaves are not contained in teabags; rather, they are freely suspended in the water. As the leaves themselves are not consumed with the tea, it is usual to filter them out with a tea strainer. Strainers usually fit into the top of the cup to catch the leaves as the tea is poured.  

Some deeper tea strainers can also be used to brew single cups of tea, much as teabags or brewing baskets are used the strainer full of leaves is set in a cup to brew the tea. It is then removed, along with the spent tea leaves, when the tea is ready to drink. By using a tea strainer in this way, the same leaves can be used to brew multiple cups.

Despite the fact that tea strainer use has declined in the 20th century with mass production of the tea bag, it is still preferred among connoisseurs, who claim that keeping the leaves packed in a bag, rather than freely circulating, inhibits diffusion. Many assert that inferior ingredients, namely dust-quality tea, are often used in tea bags. 

Tea strainers are usually either sterling silver, stainless steel, or china. Strainers often come in a set, with the strainer itself and a small saucer for it to rest on between cups. Tea strainers themselves have often been turned into artistic masterpieces of the silver- and goldsmith's craft, as well as rarer specimens of fine porcelain.

Brewing baskets (or infusing baskets) resemble tea strainers, but are more typically put in the top of a teapot to keep the tea leaves contained during brewing. There is no definitive boundary between a brewing basket and a tea strainer, and the same tool might be used for both purposes.

Other uses
Tea strainers may also be used for separating milk solids from ghee. A further use is to separate the liquid from the solid when preparing Béarnaise sauce.

Tea strainers or a similar small sieve may also be used by patients trying to pass a kidney stone. The patient urinates through the strainer, thereby ensuring that, if a stone is passed, it will be caught for evaluation and diagnosis.

See also
 Bombilla
 Cheesecloth
 Coffee filter

Teaware